The Sutton Bonington weather station is a functioning weather station located in Sutton Bonington, Nottinghamshire in England. The Sutton Bonington station was formerly Nottingham's main weather station.

The weather station was established in 1908 and the recording of weather records began in 1924. The weather centre is currently being managed by the Met Office.

Climate

Like most of the United Kingdom, Sutton Bonington lies within the hardiness zone 8b and AHS heat zone 1.

Due to being located at a lower elevation than Watnall, Sutton Bonington has slightly warmer days on average, but due to being located further away from an urban area than Watnall, Sutton Bonington can sometimes experience slightly colder nights and reports more days of air frost on average than Watnall.

The highest temperature recorded at Sutton Bonington was 39°C on 19 July 2022, surpassing the previous record of 36°C, which had only been set in July 2019.

Notes

References

Meteorological stations
Buildings and structures in Nottinghamshire
Science and technology in Nottinghamshire
Met Office